Wei Xin (born April 18, 1977, in Chongqing) is a Chinese football manager and former player who is the current manager of Fujian Broncos F.C. Before becoming a coach, he played professionally as a versatile defender or midfielder who predominantly represented Chongqing Lifan as well as the Chinese national football team.

Playing career
Wei Xin was inseparable from Chongqing throughout his entire football career playing for youth and then senior teams within the city. When Qianwei Huandao football club moved into the city and then later rename themselves Chongqing Lifan they would take on Wei Xin and give him the chance to play in the top tier of Chinese football. With this club he would become a vital member of the team and win the 2000 Chinese FA Cup, which was his greatest achievement with the club. This would lead to an international call-up where he would make his debut against North Korea on August 3, 2001, in a 2–2 draw. He would miss the 2002 FIFA World Cup, however his ability to play as a left back or midfield saw him able to return to the national team and be included in the 2004 AFC Asian Cup where he played a vital part in the teams runners-up position. Despite not even being thirty years old he was rewarded with his loyalty towards Chongqing with a coaching position, which he took seriously enough to end his playing career by the end of the 2006 league season.

Management career
At the start of the 2007 league season Wei Xin was offered the head coach position within Chongqing Lifan; this made him the youngest coach in China's professional football history. His appointment required him to win promotion from the recently relegated side, which was something he achieved when he guided the team to a runners-up position at the end of the 2008 league season and promotion back into the Chinese Super League.

Career statistics

International
All international A matches are counted

Honours

Player

Club
1995 – China City Games 5th
1998-2001 – China Super League 4th
2000 – Philips Chinese FA Cup

International
2004 – AFC Asian Cup Runner-up

References

External links

Profile at Sports.sina.com.cn

1977 births
Living people
Chinese footballers
Footballers from Chongqing
Chongqing Liangjiang Athletic F.C. players
Chongqing Liangjiang Athletic F.C. managers
China international footballers
2004 AFC Asian Cup players
Chinese football managers
Association football defenders
Nantong Zhiyun F.C. managers
Association football midfielders